Beesby is a village in the East Lindsey district of Lincolnshire, England.The village is situated approximately  south-west from Mablethorpe, and just to the east of the A1104 road. Beesby is part of the civil parish of Beesby with Saleby.

The Grade II listed parish church is dedicated to St Andrew.

References

External links

Villages in Lincolnshire
East Lindsey District